Veuves is a former commune in the Loir-et-Cher department in central France. On 1 January 2017, it was merged into the new commune Veuzain-sur-Loire. Its population was 206 in 2019.

See also
Communes of the Loir-et-Cher department

References

Former communes of Loir-et-Cher